Colin Russell (born July 2, 1984) is a Canadian competitive swimmer and freestyle specialist.  Russell won a silver medal in the 4x200-metre freestyle relay at the 2005 World Aquatics Championships.  At the 2008 Summer Olympics in Beijing, he competed in the 200 metre freestyle (finishing fourteenth), 4x100-metre freestyle relay (finishing sixth), and 4x200-metre freestyle relay (finishing fifth).  At the 2012 Summer Olympics, he competed in the 4 x 100 and the 4 x 200 metre relays.

Russell was an MSc student in kinesiology at Brock University.  His sister Sinead has also represented Canada in Olympic swimming.

See also
 World record progression 4 × 200 metres freestyle relay

References

External links
 Biography at swimming.ca

1984 births
Living people
Canadian male freestyle swimmers
World record setters in swimming
Olympic swimmers of Canada
Sportspeople from Oshawa
Swimmers at the 2003 Pan American Games
Swimmers at the 2008 Summer Olympics
Swimmers at the 2012 Summer Olympics
University of Toronto alumni
World Aquatics Championships medalists in swimming
Commonwealth Games medallists in swimming
Commonwealth Games bronze medallists for Canada
Swimmers at the 2006 Commonwealth Games
Pan American Games medalists in swimming
Pan American Games bronze medalists for Canada
Medalists at the 2003 Pan American Games
Medallists at the 2006 Commonwealth Games